Louis Hailey (10 January 1926 – 10 March 2019) was an Australian field hockey player. He competed at the 1956 Summer Olympics and the 1960 Summer Olympics.

References

External links
 

1926 births
2019 deaths
Australian male field hockey players
Olympic field hockey players of Australia
Field hockey players at the 1956 Summer Olympics
Field hockey players at the 1960 Summer Olympics
Sportspeople from Brisbane